PDQ Chocolate was a drink mix in the 1960s and 1970s.  It was manufactured by Ovaltine.  It has been sold as "PDQ Chocolate Flavor Beads" and "PDQ Choco Chips."  "Egg Nog Flavored PDQ" and "Strawberry PDQ" were also available.  These flavored beads and chips were used to mix with milk or to sprinkle over ice cream.

PDQ sponsored a Merrill-Heatter game show PDQ, which ran in syndication from September 1965 to September 1969.

Ovaltine discontinued the PDQ products about 1995 or 1996.

References

External links
  Food Of The '70s

Drink brands